The Gippsland Super 6 is a golf tournament that was played for the first time in November 2019. It is played at Warragul Country Club in Warragul, Gippsland, in south-eastern Victoria, Australia.

Format
The tournament uses a "Super 6" format. The first three days consist of ordinary stroke play, with a cut after 36 holes reducing the field to the top 50 and ties. After 54 holes, the field is cut to a fixed 24. On the final day, there is a knock-out phase, when six-hole stroke play contests are played. The leading 8 players after 54 holes receive a bye to the second round.

History
Because of bad weather the inaugural event in 2019 was reduced to 54 holes, the knockout phase being abandoned. Tom Power Horan won with a score of 205, 11 under par, beating Brady Watt by a stroke.

Marcus Fraser won the January 2021 event, beating Swiss professional Alessandro Noseda by a stroke in the final. Fraser had been close to defeat in his opening knockout match against Andrew Martin. Martin was two strokes ahead with two holes to play but then had a double-bogey, while Fraser made a birdie.

Jack Thompson won the December 2021 event, beating Jordan Zunic in the final. They were tied after six holes but Thompson won at the first extra hole.

Winners

Notes

References

External links
Coverage on PGA Tour of Australasia's official site

PGA Tour of Australasia events
Golf tournaments in Australia
Golf in Victoria (Australia)
Recurring sporting events established in 2019
2019 establishments in Australia